People Today was an adult magazine founded in 1950. The first issue was published on June 20, 1950 and featured Faye Emerson on the Cover. People Today, a magazine about headline people was a pocket digest which was originally published bi-weekly by Weekly Publications Inc. based in Dayton, Ohio, and sold 10 cents. Weekly Publications Inc. was at that time the publisher of Newsweek and Today.

Purchased by Hillman Periodicals end of January 1951, the magazine was published from the 1950s to the 1970s, following the steps of Playboy and Modern Man. The small 4 X 6 magazine format fit perfectly in the breast pocket of a gentleman's suit coat or in a woman's pocket book. One of the unique characteristics of People Today was the attractive photos of beautiful, sexy women often scantily clothed on the front and back covers. Because of this, People Today soon became categorized as a risque or cheesecake periodical. People Today featured models, celebrities, the elite, news you can use and people in the know. 
The magazine featured many popular models such as Pat Sheehan, Mara Corday, Marilyn Monroe, Jayne Mansfield, Elizabeth Taylor, June Blair, and Jean Carroll. Subjects of the magazine included women, money, celebrities, and gossip.

The magazine was sold to P.T. Publications, Inc. (New York) and defunct in 1977.

References

Men's magazines published in the United States
Weekly magazines published in the United States
Celebrity magazines published in the United States
Defunct magazines published in the United States
Magazines established in 1950
Magazines with year of disestablishment missing
Biweekly magazines published in the United States
Magazines published in Ohio
Magazines disestablished in 1977
Mass media in Dayton, Ohio
Magazines published in New York City